Exodus was a Polish symphonic rock band, active 1976–1985. Exodus was one of the leading progressive rock bands (sometimes described as "art-rock") in Polish rock in late 1970s and early 1980s.

Members

Past members 

 Andrzej Puczyński – guitar
 Wojciech Puczyński – bass guitar
 Władysław Komendarek – keyboards
 Paweł Birula – vocals, 12-string guitar
 Zbigniew Fyk – drums
 Marek Wójcicki – guitar
 Kazimierz Barlasz – vocals
 Jacek Olejnik – keyboards
 Bogdan Łoś – guitar
 Joanna Rosińska – vocals

Discography

Albums 

Nadzieje, niepokoje, (recorded 1977, released 2006 in the box The Most Beautiful Dream. Anthology 1977–1985)
The Most Beautiful Day (1980)
Supernova (1981)
Singles Collection (1992)
Najpiękniejszy dzień (2000)
Hazard (recorded 1983, released 2006 in the box The Most Beautiful Dream. Anthology 1977–1985)

Singles 

Uspokojenie wieczorne/To co pamiętam
Niedokończony sen/Dotyk szczęścia
Ostatni teatrzyk objazdowy
Spróbuj wznieść się wyżej/Jest taki dom
Jestem automatem/Najdłuższy lot (1982)
Kosmiczny ojcze/Ta frajda (1985)

References 

https://books.google.com/books?id=F3HTHpikwq4C&pg=PA241&dq=Polish+band+Exodus&hl=en&ei=FanYTfO1IZKEtgexxrXoDg&sa=X&oi=book_result&ct=result&resnum=2&ved=0CDIQ6AEwAQ#v=onepage&q=Polish%20band%20Exodus&f=false

Polish progressive rock groups
Symphonic rock groups
Musical groups established in 1976
Musical groups disestablished in 1985